Charles Cecil, Viscount Cranborne MP (1619 – December 1660), was an English nobleman and politician who sat in the House of Commons from 1640 to 1648.

Cranborne was the eldest son of William Cecil, 2nd Earl of Salisbury and his wife Lady Catherine Howard, a daughter of the 1st Earl of Suffolk and bore the courtesy title of Viscount Cranborne. He was educated at St John's College, Cambridge.

In April 1640, Cranborne was elected Member of Parliament for Hertford for the Short Parliament and he was re-elected in November 1640 for the Long Parliament. He was Lord Lieutenant of Hertfordshire from 1640 to 1642. Although not specifically excluded under Pride's Purge, he is not recorded as sitting subsequently.
 
Cranborne predeceased his father at the age of 40 without inheriting the earldom. He had married Lady Diana Maxwell, daughter of James Maxwell, 1st Earl of Dirletoun. Their son James succeeded his grandfather as Earl of Salisbury.

References

External links
 findagrave.com burial record

1619 births
1660 deaths
Alumni of St John's College, Cambridge
British courtesy viscounts
Heirs apparent who never acceded
English MPs 1640 (April)
English MPs 1640–1648
Lord-Lieutenants of Hertfordshire